The Chockalog River is a river in the U.S. states of Massachusetts and Rhode Island. It flows approximately 4 km (2 mi). Its name is said to mean "fox place".

Course
The river is formed in Douglas, Massachusetts by the confluence of Greene and Cedar Swamp brooks. From there, it flows south to Burrillville, Rhode Island where it converges with Round Top Brook to form the Nipmuc River.

Crossings
Brook Road in Burrillville is the only crossing over the Chockalog River due to its short length.

Tributaries
The Chockalog River has no named tributaries, though it has many unnamed streams that also feed it.

See also
List of rivers of Massachusetts
List of rivers of Rhode Island

References
Maps from the United States Geological Survey
American Indian Place Names In Rhode Island Database

Rivers of Worcester County, Massachusetts
Rivers of Providence County, Rhode Island
Uxbridge, Massachusetts
Burrillville, Rhode Island
Rivers of Massachusetts
Rivers of Rhode Island
Tributaries of Providence River